Aspergillus dorothicus is a species of fungus in the genus Aspergillus which has been isolated from soil from Tamil Nadu in India. Described by Varshney & A.K. Sarbhoy 1996, this species listed in Catalogue of Life: 2011 Annual Checklist.

References 

dorothicus
Fungi described in 1996